The 33rd Annual Grammy Awards were held on February 20, 1991. They recognized accomplishments by musicians from the previous year. Quincy Jones was the night's biggest winner winning a total of six awards including Album of the Year.

Performers

Award winners

General
Record of the Year
 "Another Day in Paradise" – Phil Collins
 Hugh Padgham & Phil Collins, producers
 "Vision of Love" – Mariah Carey
 Rhett Lawrence & Narada Michael Walden, producers
 "U Can't Touch This" – MC Hammer
 MC Hammer, producer
 "From a Distance" – Bette Midler
 Arif Mardin, producer
 "Nothing Compares 2 U" – Sinéad O'Connor
 Sinéad O'Connor & Nellee Hooper, producers

Album of the Year
Quincy Jones (producer & artist) for Back on the Block
Song of the Year
Julie Gold (songwriter) for "From a Distance" performed by Bette Midler

Best New Artist
Mariah Carey
Lisa Stansfield
The Black Crowes
The Kentucky Headhunters
Wilson Phillips

Alternative
Best Alternative Music Album
Sinéad O'Connor for I Do Not Want What I Haven't Got

Blues
Best Traditional Blues Recording
B.B. King for Live at San Quentin
Best Contemporary Blues Recording
Jimmie Vaughan & Stevie Ray Vaughan for Family Style

Children's
Best Recording for Children
Alan Menken (composer) & Howard Ashman (lyricist) for The Little Mermaid performed by various artists

Classical
Best Orchestral Performance
Leonard Bernstein (conductor) & the Chicago Symphony Orchestra for Shostakovich: Symphonies Nos. 1 & 7 
Best Classical Vocal Performance
Zubin Mehta (conductor), José Carreras, Plácido Domingo, Luciano Pavarotti, & the Orchestra Del Maggio Musicale for Carreras, Domingo, Pavarotti in Concert 
Best Opera Recording
Cord Garben (producer), James Levine (conductor), Siegfried Jerusalem, Christa Ludwig, Kurt Moll, James Morris, Jan Hendrik Rootering, Ekkehard Wlaschiha, Heinz Zednik & the Metropolitan Opera Orchestra for Wagner: Das Rheingold
Best Choral Performance (other than opera)
Robert Shaw (conductor) & the Atlanta Symphony Orchestra & Chorus for Walton: Belshazzar's Feast/Bernstein: Chichester Psalms; Missa Brevis
Best Classical Performance, Instrumental Soloist (with orchestra)
Zubin Mehta (conductor), Itzhak Perlman & the Israel Philharmonic Orchestra for Shostakovich: Violin Concerto No. 1 in A Minor/ Glazunov: Violin Concerto in A Minor 
 Best Classical Performance, Instrumental Soloist (without orchestra)
Vladimir Horowitz for The Last Recording 
Best Chamber Music or Other Small Ensemble Performance 
Daniel Barenboim & Itzhak Perlman for Brahms: The Three Violin Sonatas
Best Contemporary Composition
Leonard Bernstein (composer), Judy Kaye & William Sharp for Bernstein: Arias & Barcarolles 
Best Classical Album
Hans Weber (producer), Leonard Bernstein (conductor) & the New York Philharmonic for Ives: Sym. No. 2; Gong on the Hook and Ladder; Central Park in the Dark; The Unanswered Question

Comedy
Best Comedy Recording
Peter Schickele for P. D. Q. Bach: Oedipus Tex and Other Choral Calamities

Composing and arranging
Best Instrumental Composition
Pat Metheny (composer) for "Change of Heart" performed by Roy Haynes, Dave Holland & Pat Metheny 
Best Song Written Specifically for a Motion Picture or Television
Alan Menken (composer) & Howard Ashman (lyricist) for "Under the Sea" performed by various artists
Best Instrumental Composition Written for a Motion Picture or for Television
James Horner (composer) for Glory performed by James Horner & the Boys Choir of Harlem
Best Arrangement on an Instrumental
Jerry Hey, Quincy Jones, Ian Prince & Rod Temperton (arrangers) for "Birdland" performed by Quincy Jones
Best Instrumental Arrangement Accompanying Vocal(s)
Glen Ballard, Jerry Hey, Quincy Jones & Clif Magness (arrangers) for "The Places You Find Love" performed by Siedah Garrett & Chaka Khan

Country
Best Country Vocal Performance, Female
Kathy Mattea for "Where've You Been"
Best Country Vocal Performance, Male
Vince Gill for "When I Call Your Name"
Best Country Performance by a Duo or Group with Vocal
The Kentucky Headhunters for Pickin' on Nashville
Best Country Vocal Collaboration 
Chet Atkins & Mark Knopfler for "Poor Boy Blues"
Best Country Instrumental Performance
Chet Atkins & Mark Knopfler for "So Soft, Your Goodbye"
Best Country Song
Don Henry & Jon Vezner (songwriters) for "Where've You Been" performed by Kathy Mattea
Best Bluegrass Recording
Alison Krauss for I've Got That Old Feeling

Folk
Best Traditional Folk Recording
Doc Watson for On Praying Ground
Best Contemporary Folk Recording
Shawn Colvin for Steady On

Gospel
Best Pop Gospel Album
Sandi Patti for Another Time... Another Place 
Best Rock/Contemporary Gospel Album
Petra for Beyond Belief
Best Traditional Soul Gospel Album
Tramaine Hawkins for Tramaine Hawkins Live 
Best Contemporary Soul Gospel Album
Take 6 for So Much 2 Say 
Best Southern Gospel Album
Bruce Carroll for The Great Exchange 
Best Gospel Album by a Choir or Chorus
James Cleveland (choir director) for Having Church performed by the Southern California Community Choir

Historical
Best Historical Album
Lawrence Cohn & Stephen Lavere (producers) for Robert Johnson - The Complete Recordings

Jazz
 Best Jazz Vocal Performance, Female
Ella Fitzgerald for All That Jazz 
 Best Jazz Vocal Performance, Male
Harry Connick Jr. for We Are in Love
Best Jazz Instrumental Performance, Soloist
Oscar Peterson for The Legendary Oscar Peterson Trio Live at the Blue Note
Best Jazz Instrumental Performance, Group
The Oscar Peterson Trio for The Legendary Oscar Peterson Trio Live at the Blue Note
Best Jazz Instrumental Performance, Big Band
Frank Foster for "Basie's Bag"
Best Jazz Fusion Performance
Quincy Jones for "Birdland"

Latin
Best Latin Pop Performance
Jose Feliciano for "¿Por Qué Te Tengo Que Olvidar?"
Best Tropical Latin Performance
Tito Puente for "Lambada Timbales"
Best Mexican-American Performance
The Texas Tornados for "Soy de San Luis"

Musical show
Best Musical Cast Show Album
David Caddick (producer) & cast members with Gary Morris for Les Misérables - The Complete Symphonic Recording

Music video
Best Music Video, Short Form
Sharon Oreck (video producer), Candice Reckinger, Michael Patterson (video directors) & Paula Abdul for "Opposites Attract"
Best Music Video, Long Form
John Oetjen (video producer), Rupert Wainwright (video director) & M.C. Hammer for Please Hammer, Don't Hurt 'Em: The Movie

New Age
Best New Age Performance
Mark Isham for Mark Isham

Packaging and notes
Best Album Package
Jeffrey Gold, Len Peltier & Suzanne Vega (art directors) for Days of Open Hand performed by Suzanne Vega 
Best Album Notes
Dan Morgenstern (notes writer) for Brownie - The Complete Emarcy Recordings of Clifford Brown performed by Clifford Brown

Polka
Best Polka Recording
Jimmy Sturr for When It's Polka Time at Your House

Pop
Best Pop Vocal Performance, Female
Mariah Carey for "Vision of Love"
Best Pop Vocal Performance, Male
Roy Orbison for "Oh Pretty Woman"
Best Pop Performance by a Duo or Group with Vocal
Aaron Neville & Linda Ronstadt for "All My Life"
Best Pop Instrumental Performance
Angelo Badalamenti for "Twin Peaks Theme"

Production and engineering
Best Engineered Recording, Non-Classical
Bruce Swedien (engineer) for Back On the Block performed by Quincy Jones
Best Engineered Recording, Classical
Jack Renner (engineer), Robert Shaw (conductor) & the Robert Shaw Festival Singers for Sergei Rachmaninoff: Vespers 
Producer of the Year, (Non-Classical)
Quincy Jones
Classical Producer of the Year
Adam Stern

R&B
Best R&B Vocal Performance, Female
Anita Baker for Compositions
Best R&B Vocal Performance, Male
Luther Vandross for "Here and Now"
Best R&B Performance by a Duo or Group with Vocal
Ray Charles & Chaka Khan for "I'll Be Good to You"
Best Rhythm & Blues Song
M.C. Hammer, Rick James & Alonzo Miller (songwriters) for "U Can't Touch This" performed by M.C. Hammer

Rap
Best Rap Solo Performance
M.C. Hammer for "U Can't Touch This"
Best Rap Performance by a Duo or Group
Big Daddy Kane, Ice-T, Kool Moe Dee, Melle Mel, Quincy D. III & Quincy Jones for "Back on the Block"

Reggae
Best Reggae Recording
Bunny Wailer for Time Will Tell: A Tribute to Bob Marley

Rock
Best Rock Vocal Performance, Female 
Alannah Myles for "Black Velvet"
Best Rock Vocal Performance, Male 
Eric Clapton for "Bad Love"
Best Rock Performance by a Duo or Group with Vocal
Aerosmith for "Janie's Got a Gun"
Best Rock Instrumental Performance
Vaughan Brothers for "D/FW"
Best Hard Rock Performance
Living Colour for Time's Up 
Best Metal Performance
Metallica for "Stone Cold Crazy"

Spoken
Best Spoken Word or Non-musical Recording
George Burns for Gracie - A Love Story

Special merit awards

Bob Dylan was given a lifetime award presented by Jack Nicholson and sang "Masters of War" on the night of the first US invasion of Iraq.
John Lennon was granted a posthumous lifetime achievement award, one year after his partner, Paul McCartney.
The Chairman's Merit Award to Harry Everett Smith for the "Anthology of American Folk MusicMusiCares Person of the Year
David Crosby

Reception
In a contemporary review, Variety'' described the telecast was "one of the most unmemorable in memory" and that "This year's telecast was doomed from the moment Sinead O'Connor, the artist behind the year's most compelling record, announced that she would boycott the show because the awards celebrate commercialism." The review critiqued the performers stating that Garth Brooks stage set up resembled a "Noël Coward play", Billy Idol changed a lyric of "Cradle of Love" to state "This song is so cheesy" and that MC Hammer appeared to be wrapped in aluminium foil.

The review spoke positively about performance of En Vogue and Take 6 and the a cappella performance by Tracy Chapman.

References

Footnotes

Sources

 

 033
1991 in New York City
1991 music awards
Radio City Music Hall
1991 in American music
Grammy
February 1991 events in the United States